Qeshlaq-e Ghazanfar-e Bala (also Romanized as Qeshlāq-e Ghaz̤anfar-e Bālā) is a village in Qeshlaq-e Jonubi Rural District, Qeshlaq Dasht District, Bileh Savar County, Ardabil Province, Iran. At the 2006 census, its population was 33, in 7 families.

References 

Towns and villages in Bileh Savar County